The Upper Palatine Forest (  or Böhmischer Wald) is a mountain range in Central Europe that is divided between Germany and the Czech Republic. It is part of the larger Bohemian Massif and the German Central Uplands.

Geography

However, the highest peaks of the range lie along the eastern Czech side in the Plzeň Region of western Bohemia, northwest of the Bohemian Forest. The southern rim runs from the Cham and Furth Basin across the border to the Všeruby (Neumark) mountain pass, which is part of the Main European Watershed. The other end is marked by Waldsassen, the northernmost town of the Upper Palatinate.

Prominent rocks include the Wolfenstein and the Parkstein hill. Once a mining area for iron and gold, the uplands feature many steep valleys, medieval castle ruins and numerous hiking trails. It is a popular destination for recreation.

Rivers rising in the Upper Palatinate Forest include 
Wondreb (Odrava), a tributary of the Ohře, with Muglbach waterfall
the Waldnaab headstream of the Naab and its Pfreimd and Schwarzach tributaries
the Mže – headstream of the Berounka – and its Hammerbach (Hamerský potok) tributary.

Highest peaks

Towns and municipalities

Towns 

 Amberg, DE
 Bärnau, DE
 Poběžovice, CZ
 Přimda, CZ
 Tachov, CZ

 Rötz, DE
 Schönsee, DE
 Schwandorf, DE
 Tirschenreuth, DE
 Vohenstrauß, DE

 Waldmünchen, DE
 Waldsassen, DE
 Weiden, DE

Municipalities 

 Bad Neualbenreuth
 Bechtsrieth
 Eslarn
 Falkenberg
 Floß
 Flossenbürg
 Freudenberg
 Klenčí pod Čerchovem

 Leuchtenberg
 Mantel
 Moosbach
 Nabburg
 Neunburg vorm Wald
 Neusorg 
 Niedermurach
 Pleystein

 Plößberg
 Oberviechtach
 Rozvadov
 Schirmitz
 Tännesberg
 Waidhaus
 Waldthurn

External links 
 www.oberpfaelzerwald.de - Oberpfälzerwald.de  (also available in English)
 www.oberpfaelzer-waldverein.de - Upper Palatine Forest Club 
 www.heimat-now.de - Information about the Schellenberg Ruins 
 www.bocklradweg.de - Cycling the od railway routes and info about the Upper Palatine Forest 

 
Forests and woodlands of Bavaria
Mountain ranges of Bavaria
Mountain ranges of the Czech Republic
Bohemian Massif
East Bavaria